Gabriel John Celebre Eigenmann (born March 2, 1978) is a Filipino actor, singer, host and model. He is currently working as an exclusive talent of GMA Network.

Background
He was born on March 2, 1978, in Makati, Philippines. Gabby hails from the Eigenmann family of famous actors.  He is the son of actor Mark Gil to the '80s commercial model/actress Irene Celebre. He is also the nephew of Cherie Gil and Michael de Mesa, the grandson of veteran actors Rosemarie Gil and Eddie Mesa, the cousin of AJ Eigenmann, Ryan Eigenmann and Geoff Eigenmann, he is the older brother of Katherine "Ira" Eigenmann, and the half brother of Sid Lucero (Tim Eigenmann), Maxine and Andrea "Andi" Eigenmann. He has also a younger half-sibling trans woman social media influencer, makeup artist and model Kylie Celebre from his mother's side.

Career

Acting career
Though he grew up in a prominent family of actors, he once regretted growing up without the whole family which barely happens. At first, entering showbusiness was out of his mind and rather be a pilot or a businessman, a cook or own a restaurant. He even took up two-year Hotel and Restaurant Management at OB Montessori in which he never saw its end. But acting has found a good place in his blood and this is how he entered show business. He started his career at the age of 16. He was once a Regal Films’ teen star along with the Gwapings and other rosters of teen actors of the said film outfit.  He considered Richard Gomez and Regine Velasquez as his role models.

In 1997 when he became one of the hosts of GMA Network's Sunday noontime musical-variety show SOP (Sobrang Okay Pare!) along with Janno Gibbs, Ogie Alcasid and Vina Morales.

After playing teeny-bop and goody-good roles in several TV series, Gabby later discover his knack for villainy and eventually appeared on a range of primetime offerings. His first anti-hero role in on Angelika dela Cruz-Sunshine Dizon starrer Umulan Man o Umaraw in 2000 as he played the role of Nick, the submissive and scheming suitor of Rebecca (Sunshine Dizon). But his notable roles as a villain are in the top-rating Philippine adaptation of MariMar where he played the role of Nicandro Mejia and Munting Heredera where he played the role of Desmond Montreal. In 2010, he played the role and antagonist for Marian Rivera (Jenny) as the good-for-nothing brother Jojo in the Philippine adaptation of Endless Love (based on Autumn in My Heart). His portrayal for latter role gives him a Best Supporting Actor in a Drama Series award via ENPRESS Golden Screen Awards 2011.

After doing mostly anti-hero roles in, GMA Network entrusts him with the lead role in the GMA Afternoon Prime series Broken Vow opposite Bianca King whom he is working for the first time. And later in 2014, Gabby starred in his main role of Dading, together with Glaiza de Castro, Benjamin Alves and Chynna Ortaleza.

Singing career
After few years doing acting, Gabby ventured into a new field of interest which is singing. While his family members marvelled the audience with their acting skills, Gabby likewise wowed the aficionados with his harmonious voice and distinct talent. This new venture allowed him to be recognized more as a singer than an actor. This was his turning point of his career after he bagged three awards: Most Promising Male Artist, Best Performance by a New Male Recording Artist and Most Promising Male Singer/Performer from different respected award giving bodies.

In 1999, he was featured on singer Regine Velasquez's album R2K for the track "For the Love of You" alongside KC Montero. Together with Montero, they performed the song at Velasquez's R2K concert series which was held in Araneta Coliseum from April 7–8, 2000.

In 2001, Gabby was able to justify his talents upon the release of his debut album entitled Loving under VIVA Records. This album is mainly of pop genre and its tracks are mostly in English.

In 2006, he surprised once again his fans with his second album entitled Sa Di Kalayuan under GMA Records which was named after one of the tracks from the album that eventually became ear's favorite. The other track entitled Muli was also a hit and became a soundtrack of the romantic comedy series I Luv NY and theme song of the koreanovela Yellow Handkerchief, both on GMA Network. The album itself conveyed Gabby's nearness to the listening public.

Filmography

Television

Movies

Discography

Albums

Awards and recognition

Best Supporting Actor-FAMAS
 Best Performance by a New Male Recording Artists – 15th Awit Awards 2002
 Most Promising Male Singer/Performer – 32nd Guillermo Mendoza Memorial Awards 2002
 Best New Artist (nomination)- MTV

References

External links

1978 births
Living people
Filipino male television actors
21st-century Filipino male singers
GMA Network personalities
People from Makati
Male actors from Metro Manila
Gabby
21st-century Filipino male actors
GMA Music artists
Viva Records (Philippines) artists
Filipino male film actors
Filipino television variety show hosts